Lieutenant Colonel José Antonio Muñiz (October 16, 1919 – July 4, 1960) was a United States Air Force officer who during World War II served in the United States Army Air Forces. He co-founded the Puerto Rico Air National Guard together with then-Colonels Alberto A. Nido and Mihiel Gilormini. In 1963, the Air National Guard Base, at the San Juan International Airport in Puerto Rico, was renamed "Muñiz Air National Guard Base" in his honor.

Early years
Muñiz (birth name: José Antonio Muñiz Vazquez), was born in Ponce, Puerto Rico. There he received his primary and secondary education. He attended the "Colegio Ponceño de Varones" in Ponce and later the University of Puerto Rico (UPR). During his student years, he was a member of that institutions Reserve Officers' Training Corps (ROTC) program.

Like many Puerto Ricans who became interested in aviation, Muñiz made use of the Civilian Pilot Training Program, a federal program which came about with the approval of the Civil Aeronautics Act of 1938. The CPTP used the classrooms of the University of Puerto Rico at Rio Piedras, which was supported by government funds and which provided a pool of young civilian pilots who could be available for military service if war came. Executive Order 8974 was signed on December 12, 1941, transferring the CPTP into a wartime program under the War Training Service (WTS). All WTS graduates were now required to sign a contract agreeing to enter the military following graduation. In 1941, graduated Muñiz from the UPR and ROTC. He received a commission as a 2nd Lieutenant in the United States Army.

World War II
Muñiz joined the United States Army and in 1942 was assigned to the United States Army Air Forces (USAAF), a component of the Army and received additional training as a fighter pilot. The USAAF was the military aviation arm of the United States of America during and immediately after World War II. He served with distinction in the China-Burma-India Theater. During his tour of duty he flew 20 combat missions against the Imperial Japanese Army Air Forces and shot down a Mitsubishi A6M Zero.

Post World War II and the Korean War

Muñiz continued in active duty until May 1947. Together with then-Colonels Alberto A. Nido and Mihiel Gilormini, he founded the Puerto Rico Air National Guard (PRANG). During the Korean War he was recalled to active duty and was reassigned to the United States Air Force (aviation military branch which was formed in September 1947). Muñiz served actively in said branch until February 7, 1958.

Upon his return to Puerto Rico, he rejoined the Puerto Rico Air National Guard as Commander of the 198th Fighter Squadron. He served in that capacity until a tragic accident took his life. In 1960, Muñiz was going to fly in a formation of F-86Ds celebrating the 4th of July festivities in Puerto Rico and upon take off his airplane (51-8365) flamed out and crashed. Major General Orlando Llenza, then a fellow aviator in the unit, later described the loss in the following translation:

Muñiz was buried with full military honors at the Puerto Rico National Cemetery in Bayamon, Puerto Rico. Muñiz had married twice. His first wife was Laura Elena Lluberas Kells, who died at an early age of 18, and he had one son from that marriage: Terry Francisco Muñiz Lluberas. His second wife was Sara Emilia Olivari and they had four children: Jose Antonio, Cristina, Ana Elena, and Eric Muñiz Olivari.

Legacy
In 1963, the Air National Guard Base, at the San Juan International airport in Puerto Rico, was renamed "Muñiz Air National Guard Base" in honor of Lieutenant Colonel Jose Antonio Muñiz Vazquez. The José Antonio Muñiz Memorial is also at this base. Muñiz Air National Guard Base is the home of the Puerto Rico Air National Guard's 156th Airlift Wing and the 198th Airlift Squadron.

Awards and decorations
Among Muñiz's awards and decorations were the following:
Awards:
  Soldier's Medal
  Air Medal
  Air Force Presidential Unit Citation
  Air Reserve Forces Meritorious Service Medal
  American Campaign Medal
  Asiatic-Pacific Campaign Medal
  World War II Victory Medal
  National Defense Service Medal
  Korean Service Medal
  United Nations Korea Medal

Badges:
  WW II Army Air Force Pilot Badge
  US Air Force Pilot badge
Patch
  China Burma India Theater of World War II insignia as a badge

Further reading
Puertorriquenos Who Served With Guts, Glory, and Honor. Fighting to Defend a Nation Not Completely Their Own, by Greg Boudonck; ;

See also

List of Puerto Ricans
List of Puerto Rican military personnel
Puerto Ricans in World War II
Hispanics in the United States Air Force
Puerto Rico Air National Guard

Notes

References

Further reading
Negroni, Héctor Andrés. Historia Militar de Puerto Rico (A Military History of Puerto Rico). Turner Publishing, 1992. 536 pp. 

1919 births
1960 deaths
Puerto Rican United States Air Force personnel
Puerto Rican military officers
Military personnel from Ponce
National Guard (United States) officers
Recipients of the Air Medal
United States Army Air Forces pilots of World War II
United States Air Force personnel of the Korean War
United States Army Air Forces officers
United States Air Force officers
Recipients of the Soldier's Medal
Puerto Rico National Guard personnel